Hériménil is a commune in the Meurthe-et-Moselle department in north-eastern France.

Notable people
 Nicholas Herman, a.k.a. Brother Lawrence of the Resurrection (c. 1614 – 12 February 1691), about whose life the book The Practice of the Presence of God was written.
 René Maire (29 May 1878 – 24 November 1949), French botanist and mycologist.

See also
Communes of the Meurthe-et-Moselle department

References

Communes of Meurthe-et-Moselle